Zamość railway station (Polish for Stacja Zamość) is located in Zamość, Poland on Szczebrzeska Street, near the zoological garden. The station was opened in 1916. Demolished during the World War II, its building was twice rebuilt in 1944 and 1963. Since 2015 the building is owned by City of Zamość.

Apart from freight rail transport it is served by the passenger long-distance trains run by PKP Intercity to e.g.:
Hrubieszów,
Kołobrzeg via: Lublin, Warsaw, Toruń, Bydgoszcz,
Zielona Góra Główna via: Rzeszów, Kraków, Katowice, Wrocław Główny
as well as regional trains run by Polregio to e.g.: 
Lublin (daily) and
Bełżec of Roztocze (seasonal).

Within the town there are also two train stops: Zamość Starówka (on Peowiaków Street) and Zamość Wschód (on Zamoyskiego Street) served by all the trains mentioned above. They are communicated with the municipal bus links.

Train services

The station is served by the following service(s):

 Intercity services (IC) Kołobrzeg - Piła - Bydgoszcz - Warszawa - Lublin - Hrubieszów

See also 
Rail transport in Poland

External links

Railway stations in Lublin Voivodeship
Railway
Railway stations in Poland opened in 1916